Music@Menlo is an annual summer chamber music festival and institute in Atherton, California. The festival was founded in 2003 by cellist David Finckel and pianist Wu Han. American Public Media says that "Music@Menlo has rapidly become one of the world's top-tier chamber music festivals due to the quality of performance and its goal to rejuvenate the classical music experience." 
Music@Menlo's highly selective Chamber Music Institute offers string players and pianists ages nine to twenty-nine the opportunity to fully engage in a multitude of offerings including performances, lectures, master classes, and other educational events.
The organization also holds a Winter Residency on the campus of Menlo School, including educational and outreach events, and a series of artist-curated residencies in Menlo Park and Atherton.

Festival history

References

External links
Official website

Chamber music groups
Culture in the San Francisco Bay Area
Classical music festivals in the United States
Tourist attractions in San Mateo County, California
Festivals in the San Francisco Bay Area